Bullen is a surname, and may refer to:

 Arthur Henry Bullen (1857–1920), English editor, publisher, and a specialist in 16th and 17th century literature
 Charles Bullen, British military officer
 Charles Bullen (Utah politician), American politician
 Keith Bullen (poet)
 Keith Edward Bullen (1906–1976), New Zealand-born mathematician and geophysicist
 Lee Bullen (born 1971), Scottish professional footballer
 Luke Bullen (born 1973), English drummer and percussionist
 Marc Bullen (born 1982), Australian rules footballer
 Nicholas Bullen (born 1968), English musician and artist
 Stafford Bullen (1925–2001), Australian circus proprietor and co-founder of the African Lion Safari at Warragamba and Bullen's Animal World.
 Teddy Bullen (1884–1917), English footballer
 William Bullen (18th century), English cricketer

See also
 Anne Bullen, also spelt as Anne Boleyn, and her family (see Boleyn page)